Nikolay Yurievich Kavkazsky (born October 16, 1986) is a Russian political, LGBT and drug policy reform activist, lawyer, member of numerous human rights organizations, blogger and a political prisoner.

Political career 

Nikolay Kavkazsky was born on October 16, 1986. Since his early childhood, he was inspired by the ideas of justice, equality and peaceful resolution of conflict.

In 2007-2012, 2013 - till now he is an active member of the pro-western democratic Yabloko party. In 2008, gained 18% of the votes as the party’s regional branch’s vice chairman candidate.

 Since 2008 – an activist of the “Left Socialist Action” movement  
 2008-2010 – one of the leaders of the “Left Front” movement  
 In 2010-2011 - he held the post of the Moscow regional council of the “Youth Yabloko” branch
 2010 – a member of the “Solidarity” movement 
 2011 – ran for the federal parliamentary elections as a candidate of the “Yabloko” Party
 2011-2012 - an assistant to the chairman of the Moscow “Youth Yabloko” Committee
 Since 2010 – an active member of the human rights organization “The Committee for the Civil Rights”. He was remarkably active at the Prison visitation department of the Civil rights committee, working with former convicts, maintaining correspondence with the incarcerated and providing psychological support to their families.
 Since 2012-2013 – a member of the main board of the Working Poor Union

He has been actively involved in the Russian protest movement and authored numerous political articles. He also defended Pussy Riot and other activists.

He has also defended the rights of ethnic, religious, and sexual minorities and promoted the idea of peaceful resistance to oppression.

Arrest 

On May 6, 2012, Nikolay Kavkazsky took part in the “March of the Million” demonstration organized by the opposition and its supporters on the Bolotnaya Square in Moscow to protest the results of the presidential elections held on March 4. Those demonstrations were brutally stopped by the police and later led to a severe crackdown on the democratic movement.

The prominent sociologist, historian, and civil activist Alek D. Epstein published an article about Nikolay Kavkazsky and included his diary entries related to the events. They show that the participants of the demonstration who had peaceful intentions were brutally attacked by the police, and some suffered grave injuries: “I’ve never seen such a mess! I got clubbed by the special unit policemen a couple of times myself … I saw a lot of wounded and bleeding people…”… 
Nikolay Kavkazsky’s diary serves as a unique source of information on the 2012 protests providing an “inside” perspective. “The March Of the Millions. The Blooded Sunday. Alek Epstein. The Captivity, November 2012.

On July 25th Nikolay Kavkazsky was arrested in his own house for allegedly pushing a policeman during the demonstration (which was interpreted by the prosecution as an attempt to inflict grave bodily harm).

On July 26th the representative for the Investigation Committee brought the charges of assaulting a representative of the authorities (part 1 of Article 318 of the Russian Criminal Code) and participating in a massive riot (part 2 of Article 212 of the Russian Criminal Code).

Thus, Nikolay Kavkazsky became one of the main figures in the “Bolotnaya Square” case.

The prosecution claimed to have discovered evidence (a videotape) proving that he had taken illegal actions against the police during the demonstration, although they did not present it. On July 25 Nikolay Kavkazsky was remanded until September 24, and then his arrest was extended until November when he was finally remanded until March 6, though he suffers from some serious health problems. As of today, he is still awaiting his trial.

Struggle for human rights in prison 

Even in detention, Nikolay Kavkazsky is pursuing his political activities and his struggle for human rights. In November, he published an article criticizing the inhumane living conditions and unfair treatment that the inmates are exposed to and suggested a number of measures intended to make life in prison at least a little more tolerable. For instance, he wrote:

“Prisons in Russia could not guarantee the respect of human rights. On the contrary, the living conditions in the correctional institutions disparage the human dignity of a person and strip them of their legal right to a normal life.

I would like to remind those who may think that criminals should have no rights (although such an attitude is completely unacceptable for a civilized person), that in Russia there is an enormous number of completely innocent people who suffer behind bars, and even in the most advanced countries there are always innocent prisoners since court and prosecution mistakes are always possible. … I hope that in a humane society there will be no such institution as a prison. However, we live in the present rather than in the future, and it means that we have to deal with the existing problems. From my perspective, we cannot abolish prisons by a decree, so we have to reform them.“ Then he describes the appalling living conditions in prison including lack of light, harsh discipline, unbearable transportation measures, poor food quality, overcrowdedness and other urgent problems and elaborates on some possible improvements.

Elections to the Moscow City Duma of the 6th convocation  

Nikolai participated in the elections to the Moscow City Duma of the 6th convocation as a Yabloko candidate. He came third out of seven candidates in the electoral district and gained 12,78 percent.

See also 

 2011-2012 Russian protests

References

1986 births
Living people
Political repression in Russia
Yabloko politicians
Russian socialists
Russian LGBT rights activists
Politicians from Moscow
European Court of Human Rights cases involving Russia
Amnesty International prisoners of conscience held by Russia
Prisoners and detainees of Russia 
Russian prisoners and detainees 
Russian dissidents
Drug policy reform activists
Lawyers from Moscow
Russian activists against the 2022 Russian invasion of Ukraine